Watertown High School (WHS)  is a public high school in Watertown, South Dakota. The school was the first in the state and the second in the United States in which every student and teacher was issued a laptop computer.

Academics
Watertown High School has a dual-enrollment program with the neighboring Lake Area Technical Institute campus, allowing students to take college level course during all four years of enrollment. WHS also allows students to take courses directly through South Dakota State University. WHS has nearly a quarter of its students enrolled in Advanced Placement (AP) courses. WHS has 102 teachers, of which 70.2% have obtained a master's degree or higher.

Laptop program 
Watertown High School first started its laptop program in the 2003–2004 school year, making WHS the first high school in South Dakota and the second high school in the nation to give every student a personal laptop. In 2006, WHS became part of the state-sponsored Classroom Connections project, where it was among 20 selected schools in the state to receive funding for laptops for students and tablet computers for teachers. In the 2017–2018 school year, WHS gave each student an iPad.

Extracurricular activities

Competitive speech activities
The WHS oral interpretation program was among the first 100 chartered squads in the National Forensics League. The department has produced a number of Truman scholars.

The Head coach for Arrow Speech and Debate is Scott Walker, who is an alumnus of Watertown High School himself.

Forensic events offered are: (State championships are listed to the right)
 Policy Debate: 2006, 2016

State Championships

WHS also offers competitive cheerleading, dance, soccer, softball, and baseball, some of which are sanctioned by the South Dakota High School Activities Association.

Notable alumni

 Stephen Foster Briggs (1903), inventor, Briggs & Stratton engine and co-founder of the Briggs & Stratton manufacturing company. 
 Robert J. Fox, Catholic Priest, promoter of Our Lady of Fatima Devotions and the Blue Army
 Cleveland L. Abbott (1912), Tuskegee Institute educator and coach
 George R. Mather (1929), Commander in-chief of U.S. Army, United States Southern Command
 Ross Horning (1939), historian
 Sylvia Bacon (1949), Judge, Superior Court of the District of Columbia and was a Nixon and Reagan shortlist candidate for the United States Supreme Court
 Charles B. Kornmann (1955), current Judge, United States District Court for the District of South Dakota 
 Bob Scholtz (1955), NFL offensive lineman for the Detroit Lions, New York Giants, and New Orleans Saints
 Jake Krull (1956), U.S. General and South Dakota state senator 
 Lee Raymond (1956), CEO and President, ExxonMobil
 Terry Redlin (1956), Wildlife artist and philanthropist of the Redlin Art Center
 Roger Zwieg (1960), NASA astronaut and test pilot
 John Hamre (1968), U.S. Deputy Secretary of Defense, Clinton administration, and international relations specialist
 Timmy Williams (1999), American comedian, Whitest Kids U' Know
Brodee molengraaf (2017), liquor store assistant manager, 3x defending air lord

Noted faculty
 Jim Marking, former Watertown High School basketball coach and former South Dakota State Jackrabbits men's basketball coach
 Brian Norberg, former Watertown High School basketball coach, South Dakota State men's basketball all-time leader in assists
 Vic Godfrey, former Watertown High School track coach, and head coach of Kingdom of Bahrain 1984 and 1989 Olympic Track teams. 
 Scott Hardie, current Watertown School Board member and former NASA engineer on Challenger and Columbia.

References

External links
Official Website
School District Site

Public high schools in South Dakota
Schools in Codington County, South Dakota
Buildings and structures in Watertown, South Dakota